U Vulpeculae is a variable and binary star in the constellation Vulpecula.

It is a classical Cepheid variable and its apparent magnitude ranges from 6.73 to 7.54 over a precise cycle of 7.99 days. Its variable nature was discovered in 1898 at Potsdam Observatory by Gustav Müller and Paul Kempf.

In 1991 a study of radial velocities showed that it U Vulpeculae is a spectroscopic binary and a full orbit with a period of 2510 days (6.9 years) was first calculated in 1996.  The secondary star is invisible and is only known from its effect on the motion of the primary.

References

Vulpecula
Classical Cepheid variables
Vulpeculae, U
F-type supergiants
G-type supergiants
Durchmusterung objects
7458
185059
096458
Spectroscopic binaries